Serginho Greene (born 24 June 1982) is a Dutch professional footballer who last played for FC Lienden. Besides the Netherlands, he has played in Cyprus, India, Bulgaria, and Serbia.

Early life
Greene's life was all about football since he was a little kid, growing up in the south-eastern part of Amsterdam where playing street football was a daily routine. He was never interested in other sports like tennis or basketball, but totally in love with football. He loved to play with the ball and work on his technique by doing tricks or playing matches on the streets of Amsterdam.

At six, his father took him to FC Abcoude where he played in their youth squads until he was twelve, before joining Ajax Amsterdam's famous football school. He cruised through all youth squads until the A1 squad where they told him he was too good for Ajax' reserve team, but was not yet able to make the step towards their first team. They offered him to join HFC Haarlem on loan, but he wasn't keen on such a move. Eventually he decided to go there and to start his professional career.

Club career

Haarlem
At Haarlem he spent one season in de Eerste Divisie, playing 34 matches and scoring one goal. He still had a three-year remaining contract at Ajax which he gave up, because he did not want to play in the Eerste Divisie any longer. Ajax decided to release him and fellow Eredivisie contenders RKC Waalwijk showed interest in him. Working with Martin Jol, Željko Petrović (who still was a player at RKC in those days) and Erwin Koeman he learned a lot about professional football and he developed quickly.

RKC Waalwijk
Greene played on many positions during his RKC spell. In his first season at the club he played as a left fullback, while in his second season he played both in the centre of defence and as a right fullback. During his second season at the club he became one of RKC's key players and teams like VfL Wolfsburg, Tottenham Hotspur, Galatasaray, Hamburger SV, Rangers, AZ Alkmaar and Feyenoord Rotterdam showed interest in signing him. Eventually Feyenoord announced signing Greene on a free transfer on 14 April 2005. The main reasons for Greene to join Feyenoord were the club's reputation and their well known fanatic supporters.

Feyenoord
Greene finished the 2004–05 season in Waalwijk and joined the Feyenoord squad in the summer of 2005. At Feyenoord's presentation day on 27 July 2004 Greene flew into De Kuip by helicopter among other new signed players Maikel Aerts, Timothy Derijck, Gianni Zuiverloon, Tim Vincken and Ali Boussaboun. Feyenoord also appointed a new coach to replace Ruud Gullit and to Greene's surprise it was his latest RKC coach Erwin Koeman who was given the job.

At Feyenoord Greene impressed right from the start and gained his first team spot right away playing in the center of Rotterdam defence. Late December 2005 Feyenoord signed fellow central defender Ron Vlaar from AZ Alkmaar and questions arose about who was going to play where. As rightback Alexander Östlund left the club it was decided that Vlaar and André Bahia would play in the center and Greene would play further as a right defender. Since joining Feyenoord Greene hardly missed a match; The team however is struggling in both finances and results.

In the season of 2008–09, Greene's contract, which expires in the summer of 2009, was not renewed, as Feyenoord announced the release of Greene after the end of the season.

Vitesse
On 4 November 2009, Greene joined Vitesse on a free transfer, agreeing a one-year deal with the Dutch Eredivisie club.

In June 2010, he went on trial with a Russian side FC Terek Grozny, but Terek decided not to sign him.

Levski Sofia
On 8 August 2010, it was announced that Greene arrived in Sofia, Bulgaria in order to negotiate terms with Bulgarian side Levski Sofia. On the next day, he made his first training with Levski. Greene signed his contract with Levski, two days later, on 10 August 2010. The contract was for two years.

During the 2010–11 Levski qualified for UEFA Europa League after eliminating Dundalk, Kalmar FF and AIK Fotboll. Levski was drawn in Group C, facing Gent, Lille and Sporting CP.

Greene quickly became a first team regular playing as a defensive midfielder alongside Vladimir Gadzhev. He scored his first goal for Levski on 16 September 2010 against Gent. This goal gave Levski a 3–2 home win in their first Europa League Group stage match.

Greene started playing as a defensive midfielder, but due to Levski's defensive problems he was moved to centre-back. With the January purchase of midfielder Daniel Dimov Greene continued playing centre-half in 2011.

On 4 August 2011, he was sent off in the second leg of the UEFA Europa League match against Slovak side Spartak Trnava.

Vojvodina
On 4 July 2012, Greene signed a two-year contract with Serbian club Vojvodina.

Delhi Dynamos
On 10 September 2015, Greene signed with Delhi Dynamos and  played in their second pre-season friendly  match in the same day.

Waalwijk
In the summer of 2016, Greene returned to his former club RKC Waalwijk, signing a two-year deal.

International career
Greene was a member of the Netherlands U-16 and U-21 football teams.

Honours
Feyenoord
KNVB Cup: 2008

References

External links

Serginho Greene's profile at vi.nl
 Profile at LevskiSofia.info

1982 births
Living people
Footballers from Amsterdam
Dutch sportspeople of Surinamese descent
Dutch footballers
Association football midfielders
Netherlands under-21 international footballers
HFC Haarlem players
RKC Waalwijk players
Feyenoord players
SBV Vitesse players
PFC Levski Sofia players
FK Vojvodina players
AEK Larnaca FC players
Othellos Athienou F.C. players
Odisha FC players
FC Dordrecht players
FC Lienden players
Eredivisie players
Eerste Divisie players
Tweede Divisie players
First Professional Football League (Bulgaria) players
Serbian SuperLiga players
Cypriot First Division players
Dutch expatriate footballers
Dutch expatriate sportspeople in Bulgaria
Expatriate footballers in Bulgaria
Dutch expatriate sportspeople in Serbia
Expatriate footballers in Serbia
Dutch expatriate sportspeople in Cyprus
Expatriate footballers in Cyprus
Dutch expatriate sportspeople in India
Expatriate footballers in India